Lorenzo Sansone (1881–1975) was a horn player, a member of major North American symphony orchestras, an editor of horn music, an author of instructional methods, an educator, and a horn manufacturer.

References

External links 
 International Horn Society
 The Lorenzo Sansone Fan Page

1881 births
1975 deaths
Horn players
Horn players from the United States